Zoniagrion exclamationis, the exclamation damsel, is a species of damselfly in the family Coenagrionidae, and is the only species in the genus Zoniagrion.

References

Further reading

External links

 

Coenagrionidae
Articles created by Qbugbot